The discography of Italian singer Giusy Ferreri consists of five studio albums, two compilation albums, one extended play, twenty-seven singles—including six as a featured artist—and nineteen music videos.

Giusy Ferreri debuted in May 2005, with the release of the single "Il party", which failed to achieve commercial success. In 2008 she finished as the runner-up of the first series of Italian talent show X Factor.
Shortly after the end of the competition, she released the single "Non ti scordar mai di me" and the extended play with the same title, which sold over 300,000 copies in Italy.

Ferreri's first studio album, Gaetana, was released in November 2008, preceded by the single "Novembre". According to Musica e Dischi, the album sold in excess of 700,000 copies in Italy. Gaetana also spawned the singles "Stai fermo lì" and "La scala (The Ladder)", and it was also successful in Greece, where it was certified platinum by IFPI.

In 2009, Ferreri recorded and released the album Fotografie, entirely composed of covers of both Italian and international songs. The album was preceded by the single "Ma il cielo è sempre più blu", a recording of Rino Gaetano's 1975 hit. "Come pensi possa amarti" and "Il mare verticale" were simultaneously released as additional singles from Fotografie, while the album's final single was a posthumous duet with Luigi Tenco, "Ciao amore ciao".

In 2011, Ferreri competed in 61st Sanremo Music Festival, performing the song "Il mare immenso", which later became a gold-selling single in Italy. The song launched her third studio album, Il mio universo, released by Sony Music in February of the same year.
Three years later, Ferreri returned to compete in the 64th edition of the contest. Among her entries, "L'amore possiede il bene" and "Ti porto a cena con me", the latter reached the final of the contest and was chosen as the lead single from her fourth studio album, L'attesa.

In 2015, she appeared as a featured artist on Baby K's "Roma-Bangkok", which became the best-selling single of the year. The song was later included in Ferreri's Hits, which was also preceded by the single "Volevo te", certified platinum by the Federation of the Italian Music Industry.

Albums

Studio albums

Compilation albums

EPs

Singles

As lead artist

As featured artist

Other charted songs

Other appearances

Music videos

Notes
A  Sales based on certifications alone.
B  Supermarket is a compilation of songs recorded by Ferreri between October 2002 and February 2004. It was released by Spherica in November 2009 against Ferreri's will. The album was credited to Gaetana.
C  "Non ti scordar mai di me" did not enter the Ultratop 50 in Wallonia, but peaked at number 14 on the Ultratip chart.
D  Digital sales based on certifications alone.
E  Equivalent units including streaming figures, based on certifications alone.
F  "Roma-Bangkok" did not enter the Ultratop 50 in Wallonia, but peaked at number 29 on the Ultratip chart.

References

External links
 Giusy Ferreri discography at Allmusic
 Giusy Ferreri at Discogs

Pop music discographies
Discographies of Italian artists